Munroe is a derivation of the Scottish surname Munro, and may refer to:

In politics
 Allen Munroe (1819–1884), New York politician
 Daniel Munroe Forney, Congressional Representative from North Carolina
 George H. Munroe (1844–1912), Illinois politician
 James Munroe (New York politician) (1815–1869), New York politician
 John H. Munroe, Ontario real estate agent and political figure
 Trevor Munroe, Jamaican political scientist, labour activist, and politician

In education
 Heather Munroe-Blum, Principal and Vice-Chancellor of McGill University in Montreal, Quebec
 James Phinney Munroe, American author, professor and genealogist of the Clan Munro

In other fields
 Carmen Munroe, a British actress
 Charles Edward Munroe, an American chemist
 Eugene G. Munroe (1919-2008), a Canadian entomologist
 Gage Munroe, a Canadian actor
 Jim Munroe, a Canadian science fiction author
 Kevin Munroe, the director of 2007 CG film TMNT
 Ralph Munroe, an American yacht designer and early pioneer of South Florida
 William Munroe (pencil maker), the first American pencil maker
 William R. Munroe, a Vice Admiral in the United States Navy
 Randall Munroe, the creator of the webcomic xkcd
4942 Munroe, a main-belt asteroid named after Randall Munroe
 Lorne Munroe (1924-2020), an American cellist in the New York Philharmonic Orchestra
 Myles Munroe, a Bahamian Christian evangelist
 The Monroes (1966 TV series)

Fictional characters
 Jill Munroe, fictional detective in TV show Charlie's Angels
 Kris Munroe, fictional detective in TV show Charlie's Angels
 Mikey Munroe, fictional character in TV show Bunsen Is a Beast!
 Ororo Munroe, Marvel Comics superhero known as Storm
 Sonny Munroe, a character in Sonny with a Chance protayed by Demi Lovato

See also
 Monro (disambiguation)
 Monroe (disambiguation)
 Munro (disambiguation)

References